Bianca Russell (born 4 July 1978) is a New Zealand field hockey goalkeeper. At the 2012 Summer Olympics, she competed for the New Zealand women's national field hockey team in the women's event.

References

External links
 

1978 births
Living people
New Zealand female field hockey players
Olympic field hockey players of New Zealand
Field hockey players at the 2012 Summer Olympics
Female field hockey goalkeepers
20th-century New Zealand women
21st-century New Zealand women
People from Takapuna
Sportspeople from Auckland